Janez "Jani" Pate (born 6 October 1965) is a Slovenian football manager and former player.

Career statistics

International goals

References

External links
PrvaLiga profile 

Living people
1965 births
Footballers from Ljubljana
Yugoslav footballers
Slovenian footballers
Association football midfielders
Slovenia international footballers
NK Olimpija Ljubljana (1945–2005) players
Pierikos F.C. players
Alki Larnaca FC players
NK Primorje players
NK Triglav Kranj players
NK Olimpija Ljubljana (2005) players
Cypriot First Division players
Slovenian PrvaLiga players
Slovenian expatriate footballers
Expatriate footballers in Greece
Slovenian expatriate sportspeople in Greece
Expatriate footballers in Cyprus
Slovenian expatriate sportspeople in Cyprus
Expatriate footballers in Austria
Slovenian expatriate sportspeople in Austria
Slovenian football managers
NK Olimpija Ljubljana (2005) managers